Da Vinci is a Portuguese band created by Iei-Or and Pedro Luís Neves, whose members included Ricardo, Joaquim Andrade, Dora and Sandra Fidalgo, among others throughout the years. Since Ricardo had a plane accident, he was replaced by Tó.

They represented Portugal in the Eurovision Song Contest 1989 with the song "Conquistador" and finished 16th.

Presently only the two founding members are in the band.

History
2007
Performed at the Atlântico Pavilion for 9,000 people in RTP's live broadcast of Diz que é uma espécie de Réveillon with Gato Fedorento.

1999
Momentos de Paixão album released.

1995
Oiçam album released.

1993
Entre o Inferno e o Paraíso album released.

1991
Toured Portugal and Canada.
1992 new year in Toronto.

1990
Dança dos Planetas album released.
Conquistador album goes Gold (50,000+ units sold) and Platinum (100,000+ units sold).
Conquistador single published in several European countries.

1989
Baby (Foi Tudo por Amor) single released.
Conquistador album released.
1st prize at the 25th RTP Song Contest.
Casa da Imprensa Mensagem TV Europa popularity prize.
Represented Portugal with Conquistador at the Eurovision Song Contest in Lausanne, Switzerland.
Toured mainland Portugal and islands, France, Switzerland, South Africa, and more.

1988
A Jóia no Lótus album released.

1986
Prince of Xanadu single released.

1985
Momentos de Paixão single released.

1984
Anjo Azul single released.

1983
Caminhando album released.
Xau Xau de Xangai single released.

1982
Band formation.
Fantasmas / Lisboa Ano 10.000 single released.
Hiroxima (Meu Amor) single released, goes silver for 25,000+ units sold.

Discography

 Caminhando (1983)
 A Jóia no Lótus (1988)
 Conquistador (1989)
 Dança dos Planetas (1990)
 Conquistador - Dança dos Planetas  (1990)
 Entre o Inferno e o Paraíso (1993)
 Oiçam (1995)
 Momentos de Paixão (1999)

External links

 Official website

Portuguese musical groups
Eurovision Song Contest entrants for Portugal
Eurovision Song Contest entrants of 1989